Josephine Crawford Melville (12 April 1961 – 20 October 2022) a former EastEnders star, was a British actress, director and writer.

Career 
After first appearing on television in 1983 in Luna, Essex-born Melville portrayed Tessa Parker in eight episodes of EastEnders in 1986, and Ellie Wright in one episode in 2005. She also had roles on television in The Bill, Prime Suspect, Casualty and Pie in the Sky, among others, and in early 2022 she appeared in the music video for Ella Henderson's "Brave". 

In feature films, she had roles in Empire State in 1987 and in the forthcoming Slammer. In 2021 she produced and directed Assistance, a short thriller.

Other work 
In 2021, Melville held workshops across Essex as part of the Know Your Roots project on preserving the stories of black women's hair. In Southend-on-Sea, where she lived, she founded the South Essex African Caribbean Association and organised the East Beach Festival.

Death 
On 20 October 2022, at the age of 61, Melville collapsed backstage after performing in a production of Natasha Gordon's play Nine Night at the Nottingham Playhouse. She was treated by paramedics but died at the scene.

Filmography

Film

Television

External links

References 

1961 births
2022 deaths
20th-century English actresses
21st-century English actresses
Actresses from Essex
Black British actresses
English film actresses
English soap opera actresses
English stage actresses
English television actresses
People from West Ham